The Magic Swan Geese or  is a Russian fairy tale collected by Alexander Afanasyev in Narodnye russkie skazki, numbered 113.

It is classified in the Aarne-Thompson-Uther Index as tale type ATU 480A*.

Synopsis

Once there was a couple who had both a daughter and a son. They left their daughter in charge of her younger brother, but one day she lost track of him and the magic swan geese snatched him away. The daughter chased after him and came upon an oven that offered to tell her if she ate its rye buns; she scorned them, saying she didn't even eat wheat buns.  She also scorned similar offers from an apple tree, and a river of milk.  She came across a little hut built on a hen's foot, in which she found Baba Yaga with her brother; Baba Yaga sent her to spin flax and left.  A mouse scurried out and said it would tell her what she needed to know if she gave it porridge; she did, and it told her that Baba Yaga was heating the bath house to steam her, then she would cook her.  The mouse took over her spinning, and the girl took her brother and fled.

Baba Yaga sent the swan geese after her.  She begged the river for aid, and it insisted she drink some of it first; she did, and it sheltered her.  When she ran on, the swan geese followed again, and the same happened with the apple tree and the oven.  Then she reached home safely.

Translations
A more literal translation of the tale's title is The Swan-Geese.

Another translation of the tale, by Bernard Isaacs, was Little Girl and Swan-Geese.

Analysis

Tale type
The tale is classified in the Aarne-Thompson-Uther Index as type ATU 480A*, "Three Sisters Set Out to Save Their Little Brother".

German scholar Hans-Jörg Uther, in his 2004 revision of the ATU index, reported variants from Latvia, Lithuania, Russia, Belarus, Ukraine, and among the Mari/Cheremis and Wotian/Syrjanien peoples. Jack Haney stated that type 480A* seemed to appear "very rarely" outside the area of the East Slavic languages.

Variants

Russia
The oldest attestation of the tale type in Russia seems to be a late-18th century publication, with the tale "Сказка о Сизом Орле и мальчике" ("The Fairy Tale about the Blue Eagle and the Boy").

Lithuania
Lithuanian folklorist Jonas Balys (lt), in his analysis of Lithuanian folktales (published in 1936), previously classified the Lithuanian variants as *314C (a type not indexed at the international classification, at the time), Trys seserys gelbsti raganos pavogtą broliuką.

According to Stith Thompson's reworked folktale classification (published in 1961), tale type AaTh 480A* registered 30 variants in Lithuania.

Latvian
A similar story is found in Latvia, also classified as type AaTh 480A*, Bārenīte pie raganas ("The Orphan in the Witch's House"): the heroine's little brother is taken by the witch to her lair. The heroine's sisters try to get him back, and fail. The heroine herself is kind to objects on her way to the witch, rescues her little brother and the objects protect her when the witch goes after her.

Estonia
The tale type ATU 480A* is also reported in Estonia, with the title Kured viivad venna ära ("The Cranes Take the Brother Away"). In the Estonian variants, the heroine's little brother is taken away by cranes or geese.

Adaptations
1949, "Soyuzmultfilm": a 20-minute animated film "Гуси-лебеди" by the directors Ivan Ivanov-Vano and Aleksandra Snezhko-Blotskaya. It was repeatedly published on VHS and DVD in collections of the Soviet animated films.

See also

Labyrinth
Prunella
The Enchanted Canary
The King of Love
The Little Girl Sold with the Pears
The Old Witch
The Witch
Hansel and Gretel
Diamonds and Toads
Frau Holle

References

Russian fairy tales
Fairy tales collected by Alexander Afanasyev
Fictional geese
Animal tales
Fictional swans
ATU 300-399
ATU 460-499